The 1960 Oklahoma State Cowboys baseball team represented the Oklahoma State University in the 1960 NCAA University Division baseball season.  The team was coached by Toby Greene in his 17th year at Oklahoma State.

The Cowboys were named the District V champions and advanced to the College World Series, where they were defeated by the Minnesota Golden Gophers.

Roster

Schedule 

! style="" | Regular Season
|- valign="top" 

|- align="center" bgcolor="#ccffcc"
| 1 || March 26 || at  || Rice Baseball Field • Houston, Texas || 10–1 || 1–0 || –
|- align="center" bgcolor="#ccffcc"
| 2 || March 27 || at Rice || Rice Baseball Field • Houston, Texas || 4–2 || 2–0 || –
|-

|- align="center" bgcolor="#ffcccc"
| 3 || April 1 || at  || Buffalo Stadium • Houston, Texas || 0–4 || 2–1 || –
|- align="center" bgcolor="#ccffcc"
| 4 || April 2 || at Houston || Buffalo Stadium • Houston, Texas || 1–0 || 3–1 || –
|- align="center" bgcolor="#ccffcc"
| 5 || April 8 || at  || Simmons Field • Columbia, Missouri || 4–3 || 4–1 || 1–0
|- align="center" bgcolor="#ccffcc"
| 6 || April 9 || at Missouri || Simmons Field • Columbia, Missouri || 2–1 || 5–1 || 2–0
|- align="center" bgcolor="#ccffcc"
| 7 || April 9 || at Missouri || Simmons Field • Columbia, Missouri || 2–0 || 6–1 || 3–0
|- align="center" bgcolor="#ccffcc"
| 8 || April 15 || at  || Frank Myers Field • Manhattan, Kansas || 8–1 || 7–1 || 4–0
|- align="center" bgcolor="#ccffcc"
| 9 || April 15 || at Kansas State || Frank Myers Field • Manhattan, Kansas || 9–2 || 8–1 || 5–0
|- align="center" bgcolor="#ccffcc"
| 10 || April 16 || at Kansas State || Frank Myers Field • Manhattan, Kansas || 11–2 || 9–1 || 6–0
|- align="center" bgcolor="#ccffcc"
| 11 || April 25 ||  || Unknown • Stillwater, Oklahoma || 13–3 || 10–1 || 7–0
|- align="center" bgcolor="#ffcccc"
| 12 || April 25 || Oklahoma || Unknown • Stillwater, Oklahoma || 7–9 || 10–2 || 7–1
|- align="center" bgcolor="#ffcccc"
| 13 || April 26 || Oklahoma || Unknown • Stillwater, Oklahoma || 0–4 || 10–3 || 7–2
|-

|- align="center" bgcolor="#ccffcc"
| 14 || May 6 ||  || Unknown • Stillwater, Oklahoma || 2–0 || 11–3 || 8–2
|- align="center" bgcolor="#ccffcc"
| 15 || May 7 || Nebraska || Unknown • Stillwater, Oklahoma || 7–2 || 12–3 || 9–2
|- align="center" bgcolor="#ffcccc"
| 16 || May 13 ||  || Unknown • Stillwater, Oklahoma || 3–4 || 12–4 || 9–3
|- align="center" bgcolor="#ccffcc"
| 17 || May 13 || Colorado || Unknown • Stillwater, Oklahoma || 13–2 || 13–4 || 10–3
|- align="center" bgcolor="#ccffcc"
| 18 || May 14 || Colorado || Unknown • Stillwater, Oklahoma || 1–0 || 14–4 || 11–3
|- align="center" bgcolor="#ffcccc"
| 19 || May 20 || at  || Unknown • Ames, Iowa || 0–4 || 14–5 || 11–4
|- align="center" bgcolor="#ccffcc"
| 20 || May 21 || at Iowa State || Unknown • Ames, Iowa || 10–5 || 15–5 || 12–4
|-

|-
|-
! style="" | Postseason
|- valign="top"

|- align="center" bgcolor="#ffcccc"
| 21 || June 13 || vs Arizona || Omaha Municipal Stadium • Omaha, Nebraska || 1–2 || 15–6 || 12–4
|- align="center" bgcolor="#ccffcc"
| 22 || June 15 || vs North Carolina || Omaha Municipal Stadium • Omaha, Nebraska || 7–0 || 16–6 || 12–4
|- align="center" bgcolor="#ccffcc"
| 23 || June 17 || vs Boston College || Omaha Municipal Stadium • Omaha, Nebraska || 1–0 || 17–6 || 12–4
|- align="center" bgcolor="#ffcccc"
| 24 || June 18 || vs Minnesota || Omaha Municipal Stadium • Omaha, Nebraska || 1–3 || 17–7 || 12–4
|-

Awards and honors 
Dale DeHart
 All-Big Eight Conference

Jim Dobson
 All-Big Eight Conference

Grayson Mersch
 All-Big Eight Conference

Dick Soergel
 First Team All-American American Baseball Coaches Association
 All-Big Eight Conference

References 

Oklahoma State Cowboys baseball seasons
Oklahoma State Cowboys baseball
College World Series seasons
Oklahoma A&M
Big Eight Conference baseball champion seasons